Vona is both a surname and a given name. Notable people with the name include:

Franco Vona (born 1964), Italian cyclist
Gábor Vona (born 1978), Hungarian politician
Vona Groarke, Irish poet

See also
Vona, Colorado, town in the United States
Perşembe, a district center in Turkey (former name Vona)
Voices of Our Nation Arts Foundation (VONA), a written arts organization